Vikna Wind Farm was a former wind farm located on Husfjellet, just west of the village of Garstad on the island Mellom-Vikna in the municipality of Nærøysund in Trøndelag county, Norway. The wind farm began operation in 1991 and was owned by Nord-Trøndelag Elektrisitetsverk. It was decommissioned in 2015.

References

External links

Wind farms in Norway
Nærøysund
Vikna
Nord-Trøndelag Elektrisitetsverk
1991 establishments in Norway